Nina may refer to:
 Nina (name), a feminine given name and surname

Acronyms
National Iraqi News Agency, a news service in Iraq
Norwegian Institute for Nature Research, on the campus of Norwegian University of Science and Technology
No income, no asset, a mortgage lending concept
"No Irish need apply", an anti-Irish racism phrase found in some 19th-century employment ads in the United States

Geography
Nina, Estonia, a village in Alatskivi Parish, Tartu County, Estonia
Nina, Mozambique, a village in the Ancuabe District of Cabo Delgado Province in northern Mozambique

United States
Nina, West Virginia, an unincorporated area in Doddridge County, West Virginia
Nina, Texas, a census-designated place (CDP) in Starr County, Texas
Nina Station, Louisiana, an unincorporated community in St. Martin Parish, Louisiana
Ninaview, Colorado, an unincorporated area in Bent County, Colorado

Arts, entertainment, and media

Films
Nina (1956 film), a 1956 West German film
Nina (1959 film), a 1959 French film
Nina (2004 film), a 2004 Brazilian film
Nina (2016 film), a 2016 American film
Nina (2017 film), a 2017 Slovak film

Music

Groups
NiNa, a multinational J-pop group
Nina & Frederik, a Danish singing duo of the 1950s and 1960s
Nina Sky, an American singing duo

Classical music 
Nina (Dalayrac), a 1786 opera by Nicolas Dalayrac
Nina (opera), a 1790 opera by Giovanni Paisiello
"Tre giorni son che Nina" (often shortened to just "Nina"), an 18th century song variously attributed to Vincenzo Ciampi or Pergolesi

Albums
Nina (Nina album), a 2006 album by Filipina singer Nina Girado
Nina (Xiu Xiu album), a 2013 album by American avant-garde group Xiu Xiu
Nina (Nina Badrić album), a 2000 album by Croatian singer Nina Badrić

Songs
"Nina", by Noël Coward from the 1945 revue Sigh No More
"Nina" (Ed Sheeran song), 2014
"Draumur um Nínu" (A Dream about Nína) or simply "Nina", Iceland's 1991 Eurovision Song Contest entry

Other arts, entertainments, and media
Nina (TV series), a French television comedy broadcast on French 2
"Nina and the Neurons", a Scottish programme shown on the CBeebies channel
Nina, a 1949 play by André Roussin
Nina, a character introduced in Season 4 of the Spanish Children's show Pocoyo

People with the mononym
 Nina (musician), German synthwave electronic singer-songwriter based in London
 Nina (Spanish singer), Spanish singer, vocal coach and actress
 Nina Girado, Filipino singer
 Nina Gerhard, German singer
 Nina Kreutzmann Jørgensen, Greenlandic singer
 Nina Makino, American singer
 Nina van Pallandt (born 1932), Danish singer and actress (also of Nina & Frederik vocal duo)
 Saint Nino (anglicized to Nina), an Eastern-orthodox saint

Other uses
 Nina Printing House, a secret underground printing house in Baku, Russia, 1901–1906
 Nina Tower, a skyscraper in Hong Kong
 BLS RABe 525 train in Switzerland, also known as Nina
 Castro (clothing), an Israeli garment company originally named Nina

See also

Nela (name)
 Al Hirschfeld, American caricaturist who embedded "NINA", the name of his daughter, in most of his drawings 
 Niña, the ship used by Christopher Columbus on his 1492 voyage
Niña (disambiguation)
Nena (disambiguation)